The Tusculum Pioneers football team represents Tusculum University in college football. The team has played since 1901.

References

 
American football teams established in 1901
1901 establishments in Tennessee